Mamulanar (Tamil: மாமூலனார்) was a poet of the Sangam period, to whom 31 verses of the Sangam literature have been attributed, including verse 8 of the Tiruvalluva Maalai.

Biography
Manulanar belonged to the Brahmin caste. Mamulanar has described about the destruction of Pataliputra by River Ganges. However, there was no mention about the event of Patalipura fire of the 1st century CE. These suggest that Mamulanar lived no later than the 1st century BCE. Also, his writing about the Mauryas and Nandas indicated that he must have lived before 320 BCE. All his writings are known to contain historical information.

Contribution to the Sangam literature
Mamulanar has written 31 verses, including 1 in Kurunthogai (verse 11), 2 in Natrinai, 27 in Agananuru, and 1 in Tiruvalluva Maalai.

Views on Valluvar and the Kural
Mamulanar opines about Valluvar and the Kural text thus:

See also

 Sangam literature
 List of Sangam poets
 Tiruvalluva Maalai

Notes

References

 
 

Tamil philosophy
Tamil poets
Sangam poets
Tiruvalluva Maalai contributors